Wojciech Stefan Trąmpczyński (8 February 1860 – 2 March 1953) was a Polish lawyer and National Democratic politician. Voivode of the Poznań Voivodeship in 1919. He served as marshal of the Sejm of Poland from 1919–1922 and Senate of Poland from 1922 to 1928.

Trąmpczyński was born in Dębłowo in the Prussian Province of Posen (present-day Poland). He graduated from the law faculty of the University of Wrocław. He died in 1953 in Poznań.

External links
 About Wojciech Trąmpczyński 

1860 births
1953 deaths
People from Gniezno County
People from the Province of Posen
Polish Roman Catholics
Polish Party politicians
Popular National Union politicians
National Party (Poland) politicians
Members of the 13th Reichstag of the German Empire
Marshals of the Sejm of the Second Polish Republic
Members of the Legislative Sejm of the Second Polish Republic
Senat Marshals of the Second Polish Republic
Senators of the Second Polish Republic (1922–1927)
Members of the Sejm of the Second Polish Republic (1928–1930)
Members of the Sejm of the Second Polish Republic (1930–1935)
19th-century Polish lawyers
University of Breslau alumni
Greater Poland Uprising (1918–1919) participants
Recipients of the Order of the White Eagle (Poland)
Polish deputies to the Reichstag in Berlin
Member of the Tomasz Zan Society